Wangki Lowang a politician from Bharatiya Janata Party is a Member of Legislative Assembly representing Namsang in the Arunachal Pradesh Legislative Assembly since 1999. He was member of Indian National Congress until December 2015. He was one of 21 MLAs who broke from Indian National Congress to join People's Party of Arunachal. He became Speaker of the Arunachal Pradesh Legislative Assembly in February 2016. Alo Libang is his deputy.

In July 2016 he was one of the 30 MLAs of People's Party of Arunachal to defect back to Indian National Congress.

In December 2016 he joined Bharatiya Janata Party along with thirty two MLAs.

External links

Indian National Congress politicians
People's Party of Arunachal politicians
Living people
Speakers of the Arunachal Pradesh Legislative Assembly
Arunachal Pradesh MLAs 2014–2019
Year of birth missing (living people)
Arunachal Pradesh MLAs 1999–2004
Arunachal Pradesh MLAs 2019–2024
Arunachal Pradesh MLAs 2004–2009
Arunachal Pradesh MLAs 2009–2014
Naga people